The transfer roller was used in the production of the first postage stamps, the Penny Black, Two pence blue and the VR official. It transferred the image of the stamp from the master die to the printing plate.

The roller was sufficient in size to take between 2 and 8 impressions from the original master die.

Printing materials